Andor Ajtay (1903–1975) was a Hungarian Kossuth Prize-winning (1954) actor.

Selected filmography
 Lady Seeks a Room (1937)
 I defended a woman (1938)
 Two Girls on the Street (1939)
 Orient Express (1943)
 Two Wishes (1957)
 Cantata (1963)
 Imposztorok (1969)

References

External links
 

1903 births
1975 deaths
Hungarian male film actors
20th-century Hungarian male actors